Narak is a Trans–New Guinea language of Western Highlands Province, Papua New Guinea.

References

Languages of Western Highlands Province
Chimbu–Wahgi languages